Aulonocara brevinidus is a species of haplochromine Cichlid it is endemic to Lake Malawi and widespread along the eastern shore of the lake. It is found in Malawi, Mozambique, and Tanzania. The diet appears to consist of small invertebrates.

References

brevinidus
Taxa named by Ad Konings
Fish described in 1995
Taxonomy articles created by Polbot